Danilo Nikolić (Serbian Cyrillic: Данило Николић; born 29 July 1983) is a Serbian footballer, playing for Brodarac.

He came after a season spent in Albanian Superliga club Dinamo Tirana. He made his debut for FK Bežanija in 2001. In August 2008 he signed a contract with Albanian champions Dinamo Tirana. After one season there, he returned to Serbia signing with OFK Beograd.

References

External links
 
 Profile at Srbijafudbal
 Danilo Nikolić Stats at Utakmica.rs

1983 births
Living people
Footballers from Belgrade
Serbian footballers
Serbian expatriate footballers
Kardemir Karabükspor footballers
Elazığspor footballers
FK Bežanija players
FK Dinamo Tirana players
OFK Beograd players
Hapoel Haifa F.C. players
FK Voždovac players
FC Akzhayik players
FK Proleter Novi Sad players
FK Brodarac players
Serbian First League players
Serbian SuperLiga players
Süper Lig players
Israeli Premier League players
Kazakhstan Premier League players
Association football defenders
Expatriate footballers in Albania
Expatriate footballers in Turkey
Expatriate footballers in Israel
Expatriate footballers in Kazakhstan